Karsten Bindrich (born 15 April 1973 in Lutherstadt Wittenberg) is a German sport shooter who specializes in the trap.

At the 2004 Olympic Games he finished in joint fourteenth place in the trap qualification, missing a place among the top six, who progressed to the final round.

At the 2008 Olympic Games he finished in joint sixth place in the trap qualification. Losing in the subsequent shoot-off against Michael Diamond and Josip Glasnović, Bindrich missed out on the final again.

Olympic results

Records

References

 
 

1973 births
Living people
German male sport shooters
Shooters at the 1996 Summer Olympics
Shooters at the 2004 Summer Olympics
Shooters at the 2008 Summer Olympics
Olympic shooters of Germany
World record holders in shooting
Trap and double trap shooters
Shooters at the 2012 Summer Olympics
European Games competitors for Germany
Shooters at the 2015 European Games